Staal is a Dutch surname, cognate to German Stahl, meaning "steel". Though possibly also of patronymic origin, it may be a metonymic occupational surname referring to a smith. Notable people with the surname include:

Abraham Staal (1752–1804), Dutch Mennonite teacher and political activist
Boele Staal (born 1947),  Dutch D66 politician
Ede Staal (1941–1986), Dutch singer-songwriter
Egor Egorovich Staal (1822–1907), Russian diplomat, ambassador to the UK 1884–1902
Eric Staal (born 1984), Canadian ice hockey player, brother of Jared, Jordan and Marc
Flossie Wong-Staal (born 1947), American virologist and molecular biologist
Frits Staal (born 1930), Dutch philosopher and Indologist
Gert Staal (born 1956), Dutch design publicist
Herta Staal (born 1930), Austrian film actress and singer
Jacob Staal (1913–1981), Dutch commando during World War II
Jan Frederik Staal (1879–1940), Dutch architect, husband of Margaret
Jared Staal (born 1990), Canadian ice hockey player, brother of Eric, Jordan and Marc
Jesper Staal (born 1972), Danish sprint canoer
Jonas Staal (born 1981), Dutch visual artist
Jordan Staal (born 1988), Canadian ice hockey player, brother of Eric, Jared and Marc
 (1777–1853), Baltic German general of the Russian Army
Kim Staal (born 1978), Danish ice hockey player
Marc Staal (born 1987), Canadian ice hockey player, brother of Eric, Jared and Jordan
Margaret Staal-Kropholler (1891–1966), Dutch architect, wife of Jan Frederik
Marguerite de Launay, baronne de Staal (1684–1750), French author
Pierre-Gustave Staal (1817–1882), French lithographer , illustrator and draughtsman
Viktor Staal (1909–1982), Austrian actor

See also 
 Staal Jørpeland IL, a Norwegian Sports club
 Staal Aanderaa (born 1931), Norwegian mathematician
 Staël
 Stahl
 Stal (disambiguation)

References

Dutch-language surnames
Occupational surnames